The Borel C.A.P. 2, later SGCIM C.A.P. 2, was a prototype, all-metal framed, high-altitude sesquiplane fighter and reconnaissance aircraft with a supercharged engine, built in France around 1920. It was displayed, uncovered, at the 1922 Paris Salon.

Design and development

The C.A.P. 2 shared many external features with the earlier Borel-Boccacio Type 3000, or Borel C.2, a two-seat fighter tested too late for World War I, in 1919. Intended for high altitudes, the C.A.P. 2 had a wing area increased by 23% through an increase in span and was also about  longer. However, unlike the wood-framed C.2, the C.A.P. 2 had a fabric covered all-metal duralumin structure.

It was a two-bay sesquiplane, with 4° of wing sweep and two parallel spars in each of the equal span wings, though the lower wing had 63% of the chord of the top wing. The top wing had 2° of dihedral and the lower wing none.

The C.A.P. 2 was powered by an upright, water-cooled, Hispano-Suiza V-8 engine fitted with a Rateau supercharger. Behind the engine the fuselage was flat-sided and constructed around four longerons, interconnected by frames. There were two open cockpits which were fitted with dual controls. The pilot sat forward under a cut-out in the upper wing trailing edge, and the lower wing also had a cut-out which together, increased the field of view. The rear cockpit was to the rear of the wing and was provided with a gun-ring. Dual controls allowed the gunner to take over in an emergency. The tail was conventional, with a broad-chord, triangular fin which carried a broad rudder of rounded profile which extended down to the lower longerons. Its semi-elliptical tailplane was mounted on top of the fuselage and braced from below with a pair of parallel struts. The elevators were rounded in plan, with a gap between for rudder movement.

The fighter had a conventional fixed undercarriage with wheels on a single axle joined by rubber links to a transverse strut mounted on the lower longerons by a V-strut at each end. Its tailskid was wood, unlike the rest of the structure.

Operational history
It is not known if the C.A.P. 2 was ever flown. It had arrived too late for World War I and may have been exhibited at the 1922 Salon solely for its metal construction, then quite novel. No records of it are known from after the Salon.

Specifications

See also

References

Citations

Bibliography

biplanes
1920s French fighter aircraft
Borel aircraft